There have been two Halkett Baronetcies, both in the Baronetage of Nova Scotia — one in 1662 for Charles Halkett and the other in 1697 for politician Peter Wedderburn, who changed his name to Halkett in 1705. Both baronetcies are extinct.

Halkett baronets (25 January 1662)
Sir Charles Halkett, 1st Baronet (died 1697)
Sir James Halkett, 2nd Baronet  (died 1705)

Wedderburn, later Halkett baronets of Pitfirrane, Fife (31 December 1697)

Sir Peter Halkett, 1st Baronet (–1746) 
Sir Peter Halkett, 2nd Baronet (1695–1755) 
Sir Peter Halkett, 3rd Baronet (died 1792) 
Sir John Halkett, 4th Baronet (1720–1793) born John Wedderburn who married Elizabeth Fletcher
Sir Charles Halkett, 5th Baronet (1764–1837)
Sir Peter Halkett, 6th Baronet (1765–1839)
Sir John Halkett, 7th Baronet (1805–1847)
Sir Peter Arthur Halkett, 8th Baronet (1834–1904)
Madeline
Mabel

References

George Edward Cokayne, The Complete Baronetage, vols III and IV (Exeter, 1902 and 1904)
vol. III, pp. 334-335 (1662 creation)
vol. IV, pp. 373-374 (1697 creation)
thePeerage.com

External links 

 Archives catalogue for Sir Peter Arthur Halkett, 8th Baronet, Collection, The Black Watch Castle & Museum, Perth, Scotland.

Extinct baronetcies in the Baronetage of Nova Scotia
1662 establishments in the British Empire